This is a list of the first women lawyer(s) and judge(s) in North Carolina. It includes the year in which the women were admitted to practice law (in parentheses). Also included are women who achieved other distinctions such as becoming the first in their state to graduate from law school or become a political figure.

Firsts in North Carolina's history

Lawyers 

First female (act as attorney): Ann Marwood Durant in 1673 
First female: Tabitha Ann Holton (1878)  
First female (practice law without male partners): Lillian Exum Clement (1917) 
First African American female: Ruth Whitehead Whaley (1933)

Law Clerk 

 First female to clerk for the United States Court of Appeals for the Fourth Circuit in North Carolina: Doris Gray

State judges 

 First female (non-attorney): Mamie Dowd Walker in 1934  
 First female (superior court): Susie Sharp (1928) in 1949  
 First African American female: Elreta Melton Alexander-Ralston (1947)  
 First female (North Carolina Supreme Court): Susie Sharp (1928) in 1962 
 First female (Chief Justice; North Carolina Supreme Court): Susie Sharp (1928) in 1975 
 First female (Twenty-Second Judicial District): Kimberly S. Taylor (1977) in 1986  
 First African American female (superior court): Shirley L. Fulton in 1989  
First (African American) female (Thirteenth Judicial District): Ola M. Lewis in 1993 
First female (Twenty-Fourth Judicial District): Rebecca Eggers-Gryder 
First Hispanic American (female) (judicial officer): Georgia J. Lewis 
First African American (female) (North Carolina Supreme Court): Patricia Timmons-Goodson in 2006  
 First female (to swear daughter into judicial office): Tanya T. Wallace in 2018 
 First Iranian American (female): Sam Hamadani in 2018 
First Native American females: Angelica Chavis McIntyre and Brooke Locklear Clark in 2018  
First African American female (Chief Justice; North Carolina Supreme Court): Cheri Beasley in 2019  
First openly lesbian female: Alyson A. Grine in 2021

Federal judges 
First African American (female) (United States Court of Appeals for the Fourth Circuit): Allyson Kay Duncan in 2003  
First female (U.S. District Court for the Middle District of North Carolina): Catherine Eagles (1982) in 2010

United States Attorney 

 First African American (female) (Western District of North Carolina): Dena J. King in 2021

District Attorneys 

 First female: Jean E. Powell in 1989 
First African American female: Belinda J. Foster in 1993

Assistant District Attorney 

 First African American female (Thirteenth Prosecutorial District): Wanda G. Bryant

Public Defender 

 First female: Mary Ann Tally in 1974

Political Office 

First female (North Carolina General Assembly): Lillian Exum Clement (1917) in 1920  
First female (U.S. Senator): Elizabeth Dole (1965) from 2003-2009  
 First openly lesbian female (North Carolina Senate from the Ninth District): Julia Boseman (1992) in 2005

Bar Associations 

 First female president (North Carolina Bar Association): Rhoda Bryan Billings from 1991-1992  
First female president (North Carolina State Bar): M. Ann Reed from 2000-2001

Firsts in local history

 Margaret Fonvielle Heyward (1943): First female lawyer admitted to the Bar Association in Southeastern North Carolina
 Beirne Minor Harding: First female District Attorney for the Twenty-Third Judicial District [Alleghany, Ashe, Wilkes and Yadkin Counties, North Carolina].
 Rebecca Eggers-Gryder: First female to serve as a Judge of the Twenty-Fourth Judicial District in North Carolina [Avery, Madison, Mitchell, Watauga and Yancey Counties, North Carolina]
 Belinda J. Foster: First African American female to serve as the District Attorney of Caswell and Rockingham Counties, North Carolina (1993)
 Alyson A. Grine: First openly LGBT female to serve as a Judge of the Judicial District 15B (2021) [Chatham and Orange Counties, North Carolina]
 Ashley Welch: First female District Attorney for the Thirtieth Judicial District in North Carolina (2014) [Cherokee, Clay, Graham, Haywood, Jackson, Macon, and Swain Counties, North Carolina]
 Jean E. Powell: First female to serve as the District Attorney for Hoke and Scotland Counties, North Carolina (1989)
 Tami Mancos: First female magistrate in Bladen County, North Carolina (2000)
 Tamika Jenkins (2006): First African American female lawyer in Leland, North Carolina [Brunswick County, North Carolina]
 Lillian Exum Clement: First female lawyer in Buncombe County, North Carolina
 Jacqueline Grant: First African American female to serve as a resident Superior Court judge in Buncombe County, North Carolina (2021). She was the first African American female to serve as the President of the Buncombe Judicial Bar (2014-2015).
 Juanita Boger-Allen: First African American female district judge in Cabarrus County, North Carolina (2019)
 Beth Keever: First female judge in Cumberland County, North Carolina
 Mary Ann Tally: First female to serve as the Public Defender for Cumberland County, North Carolina (1974)
 Rosalind Baker: First African American (female) judge in Davidson County, North Carolina (2021)
 Karen Bethea-Shields: First female (African American) judge in Durham County, North Carolina
 Avery Crump: First female (and African American female) to serve as the District Attorney for Guilford County, North Carolina (2019)
 Teresa Vincent: First African American (female) to serve as the Chief Judge of the Guilford County District Court, North Carolina (2019)
 Carolyn Burnette Ingram: First woman to practice law in Henderson County, North Carolina
 Julia Alexander: First female lawyer in Charlotte, North Carolina [Mecklenburg County, North Carolina]
 Kathy Thompson: First female to serve as the President of the Mecklenburg County Bar Association, North Carolina
 Nell Lott: First African American female (and African American in general) to serve as the President of the Mecklenburg County Bar Association, North Carolina
 Wendy Hazelton: First African American (female) judge in Pitts County, North Carolina
 Erica Standfield Brandon: First African American female (and African American in general) judge in Rockingham County, North Carolina (2019)
 Brandy Cook: First female District Attorney for Rowan County, North Carolina (2010)
 Lorrin Freeman: First female District Attorney for Wake County, North Carolina (2014)
 Linda M. McGee: First female president of the Watauga County Bar Association. She later became Chief Judge of the North Carolina Court of Appeals.
 Mary Louise Canter: First female (non-attorney) magistrate in Wilkes County, North Carolina (1988)

See also  

 List of first women lawyers and judges in the United States
 Timeline of women lawyers in the United States
 Women in law

Other topics of interest 

 List of first minority male lawyers and judges in the United States
 List of first minority male lawyers and judges in North Carolina

References 

Lawyers, North Carolina, first
North Carolina, first
Women, North Carolina, first
Women, North Carolina, first
Women in North Carolina
North Carolina lawyers
Lists of people from North Carolina